Provincial Trunk Highway 3 (PTH 3) is a major provincial highway located in the Canadian province of Manitoba. It runs from the Saskatchewan boundary (where it meets Highway 18) to the southwest city limits of Winnipeg, where it continues as Winnipeg Route 155 (McGillivray Boulevard).  Prior before to the implementation of Winnipeg's City Route System, it extended to Pembina Highway. 

West of its junction of PTH 14, PTH 3 is designated as the Boundary Commission Trail, commemorating the historic red river cart trail which connected western communities to the North-Western Territory and to British Columbia.

Route description

PTH 3, and the Boundary Commission Trail, begins at the Saskatchewan border, with the road continuing east Saskatchewan Highway 18 (Hwy 18) towards Gainsborough and Estevan. The highway heads east to bypass Pierson to the north, where it has a short concurrency (overlap) with PR 256 and crosses a railroad line. It now leaves Pierson behind and heads for several kilometers, having an intersection with PR 252 near Elva before joining PTH 83 in a concurrency and heading north up the Souris River valley. They enter the town of Melita, where they have a junction with PR 445 before PTH 3 splits off and heads east along the southern edge of town. The highway crosses the Souris River to leave Melita, and the river valley, to head for a few kilometers to cross into the Municipality of Brenda - Waskada at its first intersection PR 452.

PR 452 joins PTH 3 in a concurrency for roughly  before splitting and heading south towards Waskada. PTH 3 curves to the southeast, after crossing another railroad track, to pass through Medora, where it has a short concurrency with PR 254, before curving back eastward to cross into the Municipality of Deloraine - Winchester. The highway now shares a roughly  concurrency with PTH 21 before splitting off at Deloraine, though it mainly bypasses the town along its western and southern sides.

PTH 3 crosses several streams and creeks as it makes its way to an intersection with PTH 10 (John Bracken Highway), roughly halfway between the town of Bossevain and the recreation areas of Turtle Mountain Provincial Park and the International Peace Garden. The highway crosses into the Municipality of Killarney - Turtle Mountain shortly thereafter, having a junction with PR 346 near Ninga before entering the town of Killarney. It passes through some neighborhoods along the southern edge of town as it travels along the southern coastline of Killarney Lake to come to an intersection with PTH 18. PTH 3 joins PTH 18 and the two head south to leave Killarney and head south for a few kilometers before PTH 3 splits off near Lena, heading east to have a junction with PR 458 near Holmfield before entering the Municipality of Cartwright - Roblin.

PTH 3 travels through the town of Cartwright, where it has an intersection with PTH 5 and crosses Badger Creek , before continuing east to have a junction with PR 442 just south of Mather before entering the Municipality of Louise. It has an intersection with its alternate route, PTH 3A near Clearwater, before crossing Cypress Creek and becoming concurrent with PTH 34. They head north through Crystal City, having another intersection with PTH 3A and PR 423, and Pilot Mound, where it has an intersection with PR 253, before PTH 3 splits off and heads eastward into the Municipality of Pembina.

PTH 3 now goes through some switchbacks as it crosses the Pembina River valley, having a short concurrency with PR 242 in the town of La Rivière. The highway leaves the river valley behind and heads due east to Manitou, where it has an intersection with PR 244 and starts paralleling a railroad. It makes a short jog to the south for a couple kilometers before curving back eastward to have an intersection with PR 528. PTH 3 travels along the southern edge of Darlingford, where it junctions with PTH 31 and PR 240, before traveling into the Rural Municipality of Stanley.

PTH 3 travels through the community of Thornhill before entering the city of Morden, passing directly through the city center and having an intersection with PR 432, though it does avoid downtown just a few blocks to the south. The highway passes by Winkler Bible Camp before entering and traveling through the Rural Municipality of Roland for the next several kilometers, having a junction with PTH 23 near Roland, before crossing Shannon Creek and entering the Rural Municipality of Dufferin.

PTH 3 enters the town of Carman and travels through a neighborhood before coming to an intersection between PTH 13 and PR 245 in a business district just south of downtown, with PTH 3 turning right and heading eastward to travel through another neighborhood before leaving Carman and heading eastward through Homewood to cross into the Rural Municipality of Macdonald.

PTH 3 immediately passes through Sperling, where it has an intersection with both PR 205 and PR 336, before curving northeastward, paralleling a railroad line to travel through Brunklid, where it has intersections with PR 305 and PR 332. The highway now passes through Sanford, where shares concurrencies with PR 334 and PR 247, as well as crossing the La Salle River. PTH 3 enters Oak Bluff at a roundabout intersection with PTH 2 (Red Coat Trail), continuing northeast along the eastern edge of the community to an intersection with PTH 100 (South Perimeter Highway / Trans-Canada Highway). Winnipeg Route 155 (Route 155) starts here, and the two head northeast concurrent with each other along McGillivray Boulevard to the Winnipeg city limits in the Fort Whyte neighborhood, at an intersection with Brady Road. PTH 3 ends and Route 155 / McGillivray Boulevard continue into the city.

The entire length of Manitoba Provincial Trunk Highway 3, with the exception of the short section between Morden and Winkler, is a rural two-lane highway.

Major intersections

Auxiliary routes
Highway 3A, alternate route in Clearwater

References

External links 
Official Name and Location - Declaration of Provincial Trunk Highways Regulation - The Highways and Transportation Act - Provincial Government of Manitoba
Official Highway Map - Published and maintained by the Department of Infrastructure - Provincial Government of Manitoba (see Legend and Maps#1 & 2)
Google Maps Search - Provincial Trunk Highway 3

003